Kayemba Kisiki was Kabaka of the Kingdom of Buganda between 1690 and 1704. He was the seventeenth (17th) Kabaka of Buganda.

Claim to the throne
He was the third son of Kabaka Kateregga Kamegere, Kabaka of Buganda, who reigned between 1644 and 1674. His mother was Namutebi of the Mamba clan, who was the eighth (8th) of his father's nine wives. He ascended the throne upon the death of his elder brother. He established his capital at Lunnyo. Lunnyo is located near the city of Entebbe, close to where the current Uganda State House stands today.

Married life
He married three wives:

 Nabbanja, daughter of Kasujja, of the Ngeye clan
 Nakku, daughter of Walusimbi, of the Ffumbe clan

Issue
He fathered three sons:

 Prince (Omulangira) Sematimba, whose mother was Nabbanja
 Prince (Omulangira) Wakayima, whose mother was Nabbanja
 Prince (Omulangira) Kewumpuli, whose mother was Nakku. He was born limbless and consequently excluded from the succession.

The final years
Kabaka Kayemba died at an advanced age around 1704. He is buried at Nabulagala, Busiro.

Succession table

See also
 Kabaka of Buganda

References

External links
List of the Kings of Buganda

Kabakas of Buganda
17th-century monarchs in Africa
18th-century monarchs in Africa
1704 deaths